Tomáš Galis  (born 22 December 1950 in Selice) is the current bishop of the Roman Catholic Diocese of Žilina.

Tomáš Galis was born, the first of five children to Stephen Galis and Christine Šprláková. In 1966 he completed the basic nine-year school certificate in Vrútky.  In 1969 he graduated from college in Vrútky.  From 1 October 1969 to 30 September 1973, he studied at the Roman Catholic Faculty of Theology in Bratislava.  In the period from 1 October 1973 to 30 September 1975 he performed military service.

He was ordained 2 June 1976 and received priestly ordination 6 June 1976 at the Cathedral of St. Martin in Bratislava. He was consecrated by Julius Gábriš, apostolic administrator of Trnava.

Honours and awards 
 Servare et Manere:

  Memorial Medal of Tree of Peace. International peace award granted by a Slovak non-governmental organization (2022).

References

1950 births
Living people
21st-century Roman Catholic bishops in Slovakia
People from Šaľa District